Mariastella Gelmini (born 1 July 1973) is an Italian politician and attorney (specialised in administrative law). She served as Italian Minister of Education in the Berlusconi IV Cabinet until 16 November 2011. She served as minister of Regional Affairs and Autonomies in the Draghi Cabinet from 2021 to 2022.

Career

Member of the Forza Italia political movement of Silvio Berlusconi since its foundation in 1994, during the same year she became chairperson of the "Azzurri" club in Desenzano del Garda settling the first representation of Forza Italia in the Province of Brescia.

In 1998 she was the first elected in the administrative poll in Desenzano del Garda and became the president of the city council until 2000, in which year a motion of no confidence against her eventually passed.

Gelmini passed her bar exam in 2001 in Reggio Calabria, far away from her home town and the university where she graduated, as the academic standards in that city were low and pass rate suspiciously high.

In 2002 she was elected as councillor of the Province of Brescia. During her term in office she devised the "Piano Territoriale di Coordinamento Provinciale", by virtue of which the environmentally protected areas of Parco della rocca e del sasso di Manerba, Parco delle colline di Brescia and Parco del lago Moro were established.

In 2005 she was elected as member of the regional council of Lombardy resulting the most voted candidate among the Lombard constituencies. After this electoral success, she became Forza Italia's political chief in Lombardy, becoming a coordinatore regionale.

In 2006 Mariastella Gelmini was elected as member of the Chamber of Deputies, the lower house of the Italian Parliament.

On 18 November 2007, she was in Piazza San Babila in Milan when Silvio Berlusconi announced the birth of The People of Freedom political movement and subsequently she became a member of the founding committee of the party. Since 2008 she has served in the Italian Government as Minister of Education in the Berlusconi IV Cabinet. In the same year she was re-elected in the Chamber of Deputies.

On 20 July 2022, she left Forza Italia after the confidence vote for the Draghi government failed to pass and the party choice to abstain.

Critics
In October 2008 demonstrations took place across Italy against the school reform proposed by Gelmini. In 2009 the reform was approved. On 8 October 2010 further demonstrations by students occurred in all the major Italian cities against Gelmini's recent reforms.
On 14 December 2010, when Gelmini's school budget cuts law was enacted, millions of students expressed their contempt, resulting in more than 20 million in damages to the capital, Rome.

Controversies
On 23 September 2011 she attracted widespread criticism for a statement released on the Education ministry website, with regard to the breakthrough at the Gran Sasso laboratory in Abruzzo, Italy, where neutrinos were recorded at a speed greater than the speed of light.
The statement wrongly declares that the Italian Government had contributed to building a tunnel between the Gran Sasso National Laboratory and CERN in Switzerland. Such a tunnel does not exist. The two locations are approximately 750 km apart. This statement caused controversy both in and outside Italy, and spawned a wave of jokes on the Internet making fun of the announcement.
Gelmini defended herself saying that her declaration referred to the tunnel used only to send the first flux of neutrins; Giovanni Bignami, president of "Istituto nazionale di astrofisica", defended Minister's statement.

Electoral history

First-past-the-post elections

References

External links

 President of the Council - biography
 Chamber of Deputies - biography
 Mariastella Gelmini on openpolis.it

1973 births
Draghi Cabinet
Living people
Politicians from the Province of Brescia
The People of Freedom politicians
21st-century Italian politicians
Forza Italia politicians
Education ministers of Italy
Italian women lawyers
University of Brescia alumni
Women government ministers of Italy
21st-century Italian women politicians
21st-century Italian lawyers
21st-century women lawyers